Heretic is a dark fantasy first-person shooter video game released in December 1994. It was developed by Raven Software and published by id Software through GT Interactive.

Using a modified version of the Doom engine, Heretic was one of the first first-person games to feature inventory manipulation and the ability to look up and down. It also introduced multiple gib objects that spawned when a character suffered a death by extreme force or heat. Previously, the character would simply crumple into a heap. The game used randomised ambient sounds and noises, such as evil laughter, chains rattling, distantly ringing bells, and water dripping in addition to the background music to further enhance the atmosphere. The music in the game was composed by Kevin Schilder. An indirect sequel, Hexen: Beyond Heretic, was released the following year. Heretic II was released in 1998, which served as a direct sequel continuing the story.

Plot
Three brothers (D'Sparil, Korax, and Eidolon), known as the Serpent Riders, have used their powerful magic to possess seven kings of Parthoris, turning them into mindless puppets and corrupting their armies. The Sidhe elves resist the Serpent Riders' magic. The Serpent Riders thus declared the Sidhe as heretics and waged war against them. The Sidhe are forced to take a drastic measure to sever the natural power of the kings destroying them and their armies, but at the cost of weakening the elves' power, giving the Serpent Riders an advantage to slay the elders. While the Sidhe retreat, one elf (revealed to be named Corvus in Heretic II) sets off on a quest of vengeance against the weakest of the three Serpent Riders, D'Sparil. He travels through the "City of the Damned", the ruined capital of the Sidhe (its real name is revealed to be Silverspring in Heretic II), then past the demonic breeding grounds of Hell's Maw and finally the secret Dome of D'Sparil.

The player must first fight through the undead hordes infesting the location where the elders performed their ritual. At its end is the gateway to Hell's Maw, guarded by the Iron Liches. After defeating them, the player must seal the portal and so prevent further infestation, but after he enters the portal guarded by the Maulotaurs, he finds himself inside D'Sparil's dome. After killing D'Sparil, Corvus ends up on a perilous journey with little hope of returning home. However, he eventually succeeds in his endeavour, only to find that Parthoris is in disarray once again.

Gameplay
The gameplay of Heretic is heavily derived from Doom, with a level-based structure and an emphasis on finding the proper keys to progress. Many weapons are similar to those from Doom; the early weapons in particular are near-exact copies in functionality to those seen in Doom. Raven added a number of features to Heretic that differentiated it from Doom, notably interactive environments, such as rushing water that pushes the player along, and inventory items. In Heretic, the player can pick up many different items to use at their discretion. These items range from health potions to the "morph ovum", which transforms enemies into chickens. One of the most notable pickups that can be found is the "Tome of Power" which acts as a secondary firing mode for certain weapons, resulting in a much more powerful projectile from each weapon, some of which change the look of the projectile entirely. Heretic also features an improved version of the Doom engine, sporting the ability to look up and down within constraints, as well as fly. However, the rendering method for looking up and down merely uses a proportional pixel-shearing effect rather than any new rendering algorithm, which distorts the view considerably when looking at high-elevation angles.

As with Doom, Heretic contains various cheat codes that allow the player to be invulnerable, obtain every weapon, be able to instantly kill every monster in a particular level, and several other abilities. If the player uses the "all weapons and keys" cheat ("IDKFA") from Doom, a message appears warning the player against cheating and takes away all of his weapons, leaving him with only a quarterstaff. If the player uses the "god mode" cheat ("IDDQD") from Doom, the game will display a message saying "Trying to cheat, eh? Now you die!" and kills the player character.

The original shareware release of Heretic came bundled with support for online multiplayer through the new DWANGO service.

Development
Heretic was developed by Raven Software with assistance by publisher id Software, the latter of which had recently pioneered the first-person shooter genre with Wolfenstein 3D and Doom. Brian Raffel, the game's director and vice-president of Raven at the time, revealed that the developer first came to id's attention with the release of its debut title Black Crypt. After providing Raven with a modified Wolfenstein 3D engine for its next project ShadowCaster and being impressed by the final result, id requested that Raven develop a medieval-themed/dark fantasy game using a modified version of id's signature Doom engine. Raffel considered himself and his colleagues as typical D&D fans and initially drafted the game with role-playing elements. They then took instruction from id programmer John Carmack to simply "do it like Doom, and add the fantasy flavor." Heretic began development in March 1994 with Ben Gokey as lead programmer and a rough storyline penned by Michael Raymond-Judy that was finalized by the game's publisher.

id designer John Romero signed on as executive producer. He recalled visiting the team at Raven, bringing them several Intel-based Epson NeXT computers, and teaching them how to use id's tools and engine. Major additions to the engine for graphics and gameplay included an expendable inventory system; the ability to look up, look down, and fly; water and wind effects on the player character's movement; and improved audio for both ambient and localized sound. Assistant programmer Chris Rhinehart was responsible for adding the flight mechanic, which Raffel described as a "happy accident". The director explained, "Chris came up with the idea of moving the horizon line just up and down. It wasn't a real calculation of flying, it was a hack... That was such a big event for us, and that gave us our unique flavor."

Release

Shadow of the Serpent Riders
The original version of Heretic was only available through shareware registration (i.e. mail order) and contained three episodes. The retail version, Heretic: Shadow of the Serpent Riders, was distributed by GT Interactive in 1996, and featured the original three episodes and two additional episodes: The Ossuary, which takes the player to the shattered remains of a world conquered by the Serpent Riders several centuries ago, and The Stagnant Demesne, where the player enters D'Sparil's birthplace. This version was the first official release of Heretic in Europe. A free patch was also downloadable from Raven's website to update the original Heretic with the content found in Shadow of the Serpent Riders.

Along with the two full additional episodes, Shadow of the Serpent Riders contains 3 additional levels in a third additional episode (unofficially known as Fate's Path) which is inaccessible without the use of cheat codes. The first of these three levels can be accessed by typing the cheat ("ENGAGE61"). The first two levels are fully playable, but the third level does not have an exit so the player is unable to progress further.

Source release
On January 11, 1999, the source code of the game engine used in Heretic was published by Raven Software under a license that granted rights to non-commercial use, and was re-released under the GNU GPL-2.0-only on September 4, 2008. This resulted in ports to Linux, Amiga, Atari, and other operating systems, and updates to the game engine to utilize 3D acceleration. The shareware version of a console port for the Dreamcast was also released.

Reception

Heretic and Hexen shipped a combined total of roughly 1 million units by August 1997.

Heretic received generally positive reviews, garnering 78% on PC Zone.

Next Generation reviewed the PC version of the game, and stated that "if you're only going to get one action game in the next couple of months, this is the one".

While remarking that Heretic is a thinly-veiled clone of Doom, and that its being released in Europe after its sequel and with Quake due out shortly makes it somewhat outdated, Maximum nonetheless regarded it as an extremely polished and worthwhile purchase. They particularly highlighted the two additional episodes of the retail version, saying they offer a satisfying challenge even to first person shooter veterans and are largely what make the game worth buying.

In 1996, Computer Gaming World listed being turned into a chicken as #3 on its list of "the 15 best ways to die in computer gaming".

Legacy
Heretic has received three sequels: Hexen: Beyond Heretic, Hexen II, and Heretic II. Following ZeniMax Media's acquisition of id Software, the rights to the series have been disputed between both id and Raven Software; Raven's parent company Activision holds the developing rights, while id holds the publishing rights to the first three games.

The game was re-released for Windows on Steam on August 3, 2007.

Further homages to the series have been made in other id Software titles; In 2009's Wolfenstein, which Raven Software developed, Heretic'''s Tomes of Power are collectible power-ups found throughout the game. The character Galena from Quake Champions wears armor bearing the icon of the Serpent Riders.

In 2014, Raven co-founder Brian Raffel had expressed interest in making a sequel to the Heretic'' series. Rather than licensing it to other developers, he wants Raven to do it themselves.

References

External links

1994 video games
Acorn Archimedes games
Classic Mac OS games
Commercial video games with freely available source code
Cooperative video games
Dark fantasy video games
Doom engine games
DOS games
First-person shooters
Games commercially released with DOSBox
GT Interactive games
Heretic and Hexen
Id Software games
Multiplayer and single-player video games
Raven Software games
Sprite-based first-person shooters
Video games about demons
Video games about magic
Video games developed in the United States
Video games with digitized sprites
Video games with expansion packs